The 2017–18 American Athletic Conference men's basketball season began with practices in October 2017 followed by the start of the 2017–18 NCAA Division I men's basketball season in November. The conference held its media day in October 2017. Conference play begin in December 2017 and concluded on March 3, 2018.

Cincinnati won the regular season championship by two games over Houston and Wichita State. The American Athletic tournament was held at the Amway Center in Orlando, Florida from March 8–11, 2018. Cincinnati also won the AAC tournament championship, defeating Houston in the championship game.

Cincinnati's Gary Clark was named the AAC player of the year while Houston's Kelvin Sampson was named coach of the year.

Cincinnati, Houston, and Wichita State all received bids to the NCAA tournament, but none made it past the Second Round as the conference went 2–3 in the Tournament.

Temple received a bid to the National Invitation Tournament, but lost in the first round.

The season marked the first season with Wichita State as a member of the AAC, having joined on July 1, 2017. As a result, the conference included 12 teams for the first time.

Head coaches

Coaching changes
South Florida head coach Orlando Antigua was fired after the first 13 games of the 2016–17 season amid academic fraud allegations. Interim head coach Murry Bartow coach was not retained by the school following the season. On March 14, 2017, the school hired Brian Gregory as the next head coach.

Coaches

Notes:
 Overall and AAC records are from time at current school and are through the end of 2017–18 season. NCAA records include time at current school only.
 AAC records are only from 2013–14 season to present, prior conference records not included.

Preseason

Preseason Coaches Poll 
AAC Media Day took place October 15, 2017, in Philadelphia, Pennsylvania. Cincinnati was picked to win the conference's regular season (seven votes) with Wichita State a close second (five votes).

first place votes in parentheses

Preseason All-AAC teams

Regular season

Rankings

Conference matrix

Player of the week
Throughout the regular season, the American Athletic Conference named a player and rookie of the week.

Honors and awards

All-AAC Awards and teams
* Unanimous Selection

Postseason

American Athletic Conference tournament

NCAA tournament

The winner of the AAC tournament, Cincinnati, received the conference's automatic bid to the NCAA tournament.

NIT 
Temple received an at-large bid to the NIT.

NBA draft
The following list includes all AAC players who were drafted in the 2018 NBA draft.

References